Ana Lucia José Tima (born October 10, 1989) is a triple jumper from the Dominican Republic. She competed at the 2016 Summer Olympics in the women's triple jump; her result of 13.61 meters in the qualifying round did not qualify her for the final. She improved her mark to 14.11 meters at the 2020 Summer Olympics in Tokyo, but was again unable to qualify for the final.

References

External links
 Ana José Tima at Eurosport
 

1989 births
Living people
Dominican Republic triple jumpers
Dominican Republic female athletes
Olympic athletes of the Dominican Republic
Athletes (track and field) at the 2016 Summer Olympics
Athletes (track and field) at the 2020 Summer Olympics
Athletes (track and field) at the 2019 Pan American Games
Pan American Games competitors for the Dominican Republic
People from La Romana, Dominican Republic